Kha is the second consonant of Indic abugidas. In modern Indic scripts, kha is derived from the Brahmi letter , which is probably derived from the Aramaic  ("Q").

Mathematics

Āryabhaṭa numeration

Aryabhata used Devanagari letters for numbers, very similar to the Greek numerals, even after the invention of Indian numerals.
   = 2 (२)
   = 200 (२००)
   = 20,000 (२० ०००)
   = 2,000,000 (२० ०० ०००)
   = 2 (२×१०८)
   = 2 (२×१०१०)
   = 2 (२×१०१२)
   = 2 (२×१०१४)
   = 2 (२×१०१६)

Historic Kha
There are three different general early historic scripts - Brahmi and its variants, Kharoshthi, and Tocharian, the so-called slanting Brahmi. Kha as found in standard Brahmi,  was a simple geometric shape, with slight variations toward the Gupta . The Tocharian Kha  did not have an alternate Fremdzeichen form. The third form of kha, in Kharoshthi was probably derived from Aramaic separately from the Brahmi letter.

Brahmi Kha
The Brahmi letter , Kha, is probably derived from the Aramaic Qoph , and is thus related to the modern Latin Q and Greek Koppa. Several identifiable styles of writing the Brahmi Kha can be found, most associated with a specific set of inscriptions from an artifact or diverse records from an historic period. As the earliest and most geometric style of Brahmi, the letters found on the Edicts of Ashoka and other records from around that time are normally the reference form for Brahmi letters, with vowel marks not attested until later forms of Brahmi back-formed to match the geometric writing style.

Tocharian Kha
The Tocharian letteris derived from the Brahmi , but does not have an alternate Fremdzeichen form.

Kharoshthi Kha
The Kharoshthi letter  is generally accepted as being derived from the Aramaic Qoph , and is thus related to Q and Koppa, in addition to the Brahmi Kha.

Devanagari Kha

Kha (ख) is the second consonant of the Devanagari abugida. It ultimately arose from the Brahmi letter , after having gone through the Gupta letter . Letters that derive from it are the Gujarati letter ખ and the Modi letter 𑘏.

Devanagari-using Languages

Conjuncts With ख

Devanagari exhibits conjunct ligatures, as is common in Indic scripts. Like most Devanagari letters, in modern texts  forms very few irregular ligatures, and assumes a half form to create most conjuncts, such as  +  = . Earlier texts show many more ligature forms, with vertically stacked conjuncts being common. The use of modern ligatures and vertical conjuncts may vary across languages using the Devanagari script, with Marathi in particular preferring the use of half forms where texts in other languages would show ligatures and vertical stacks.

Ligature conjuncts of ख
True ligatures are quite rare in Indic scripts. The most common ligated conjuncts in Devanagari are in the form of a slight mutation to fit in context or as a consistent variant form appended to the adjacent characters. Those variants include Na and the Repha and Rakar forms of Ra. Nepali and Marathi texts use the "eyelash" Ra half form  for an initial "R" instead of repha.
 Repha र् (r) + ख (kʰa) gives the ligature rkʰa (र्ख): 

 Eyelash र् (r) + ख (kʰa) gives the ligature rkʰa:

 ख् (kʰa) + र (r) gives the ligature kʰra (ख्र):

Stacked conjuncts of ख
Vertically stacked ligatures are the most common conjunct forms found in Devanagari text. Although the constituent characters may need to be stretched and moved slightly in order to stack neatly, stacked conjuncts can be broken down into recognizable base letters, or a letter and an otherwise standard ligature.
 छ् (cʰ) + ख (kʰa) gives the ligature छ्ख (cʰkʰa):

 ढ् (ḍʱ) + ख (kʰa) gives the ligature ढ्ख (ḍʱkʰa):

 ड् (ḍ) + ख (kʰa) gives the ligature ड्ख (ḍkʰa):

 द् (d) + ख (kʰa) gives the ligature द्ख (dkʰa):

 ख् (kʰ) + ब (ba) gives the ligature ख्ब (kʰba):

 ख् (kʰ) + च (ca) gives the ligature ख्च (kʰca):

 ख् (kʰ) + छ (cʰa) gives the ligature ख्छ (kʰcʰa):

 ख् (kʰ) + ड (ḍa) gives the ligature ख्ड (kʰḍa):

 ख् (kʰ) + ज (ja) gives the ligature ख्ज (kʰja):

 ख् (kʰ) + झ (jʰa) gives the ligature ख्झ (kʰjʰa):

 ख् (kʰ) + ज্ (j) + ञ (ña) gives the ligature ख्ज्ञ (kʰjña):

 ख् (kʰ) + क (ka) gives the ligature ख्क (kʰka):

 ख् (kʰ) + ख (kʰa) gives the ligature ख्ख (kʰkʰa):

 ख् (kʰ) + ल (la) gives the ligature ख्ल (kʰla):

 ख् (kʰ) + न (na) gives the ligature ख्न (kʰna):

 ख् (kʰ) + ङ (ŋa) gives the ligature ख्ङ (kʰŋa):

 ख् (kʰ) + ण (ṇa) gives the ligature ख्ण (kʰṇa):

 ख् (kʰ) + ञ (ña) gives the ligature ख्ञ (kʰña):

 ख् (kʰ) + व (va) gives the ligature ख्व (kʰva):

 ङ् (ŋ) + ख (kʰa) gives the ligature ङ्ख (ŋkʰa):

 ठ् (ṭʰ) + ख (kʰa) gives the ligature ठ्ख (ṭʰkʰa):

 ट् (ṭ) + ख (kʰa) gives the ligature ट्ख (ṭkʰa):

Bengali Kha

The Bengali script  is derived from the Siddhaṃ , and is marked by the lack of a horizontal head line, unlike its Devanagari counterpart, . The inherent vowel of Bengali consonant letters is /ɔ/, so the bare letter  will sometimes be transliterated as "kho" instead of "kha". Adding okar, the "o" vowel mark, gives a reading of /kho/.
Like all Indic consonants,  can be modified by marks to indicate another (or no) vowel than its inherent "a".

in Bengali-using languages
 is used as a basic consonant character in all of the major Bengali script orthographies, including Bengali and Assamese.

Conjuncts with 
 খ্ (kʰ) + ব (va) gives the ligature খ্ব (kʰva), with the va phala suffix:

 খ্ (kʰ) + য (ya) gives the ligature খ্য (kʰya), with the ya phala suffix:
 
 খ্ (kʰ) + র (ra) gives the ligature খ্র (kʰra), with the ra phala suffix:

 ঙ (ng) + খ (kʰa) gives the ligature ঙ্খ (ngkʰa):

 র্ (r) + খ (kʰa) gives the ligature র্খ (rkʰa), with the repha prefix:

 র্ (r) + খ্ (kʰ) + য (ya) gives the ligature র্খ্য (rkʰya), with the repha prefix and ya phala suffix:

 স্ (s) + খ (kʰa) gives the ligature স্খ (skʰa):

Gurmukhi Kha
Khakhaa  (ਖ) is the seventh letter of the Gurmukhi alphabet. Its name is [kʰəkʰːɑ] and is pronounced as /kʰ/ when used in words. It is derived from the Laṇḍā letter kha, ultimately from the Brahmi kha. Gurmukhi kha does not have a special pairin or addha (reduced) form for making conjuncts, and in modern Punjabi texts does not take a half form or halant to indicate the bare consonant /kʰ/, although Gurmukhi Sanskrit texts may use an explicit halant.

Gujarati Kha

Kha (ખ) is the second consonant of the Gujarati abugida. It is derived from the Devanagari Kha , and ultimately the Brahmi letter .

Gujarati-using Languages
The Gujarati script is used to write the Gujarati and Kutchi languages. Like all Indic scripts, Gujarati uses vowel marks attached to the base consonant to override the inherent /ə/ vowel:

Conjuncts with ખ

Gujarati ખ exhibits conjunct ligatures, much like its parent Devanagari Script. Most Gujarati conjuncts can only be formed by reducing the letter shape to fit tightly to the following letter, usually by dropping a character's vertical stem, sometimes referred to as a "half form". A few conjunct clusters can be represented by a true ligature, instead of a shape that can be broken into constituent independent letters, and vertically stacked conjuncts can also be found in Gujarati, although much less commonly than in Devanagari.
True ligatures are quite rare in Indic scripts. The most common ligated conjuncts in Gujarati are in the form of a slight mutation to fit in context or as a consistent variant form appended to the adjacent characters. Those variants include Na and the Repha and Rakar forms of Ra.
 ખ્ (kʰ) + ર (ra) gives the ligature KhRa:

 ર્ (r) + ખ (kʰa) gives the ligature RKha:

 ખ્ (kʰ) + ન (na) gives the ligature KhNa:

Odia Kha

The Odia letter kha (ଖ) is the second letter of the Odia abugida. It ultimately arose from the Brahmi letter , via the Siddhaṃ letter  Kha. Like in other Indic scripts, Odia consonants have the inherent vowel "a", and take one of several modifying vowel signs to represent syllables with another vowel or no vowel at all. Like other Oriya letters with an open top, ଖ takes the subjoined matra form of the vowel i (ଇ):

Conjuncts of ଖ 
As is common in Indic scripts, Odia joins letters together to form conjunct consonant clusters. The most common conjunct formation is achieved by using a small subjoined form of trailing consonants. Most consonants' subjoined forms are identical to the full form, just reduced in size, although a few drop the curved headline or have a subjoined form not directly related to the full form of the consonant. The second type of conjunct formation is through pure ligatures, where the constituent consonants are written together in a single graphic form. This ligature may be recognizable as being a combination of two characters or it can have a conjunct ligature unrelated to its constituent characters.
 ଙ୍ (ŋ) + ଖ (kʰa) gives the ligature ŋkʰa:

 ର୍ (r) +  ଖ (kʰa) gives the ligature rkʰa:

 ଖ୍ (kʰ) + ର (ra) gives the ligature kʰra:

Telugu Kha

Kha (ఖ) is the second letter of the Telugu abugida. It ultimately arose from the Brahmi letter . It is closely related to the Kannada letter ಖ. Since it lacks the v-shaped headstroke common to most Telugu letters, ఖ remains unaltered by most vowel matras, and its subjoined form is simply a smaller version of the normal letter shape:
Telugu conjuncts are created by reducing trailing letters to a subjoined form that appears below the initial consonant of the conjunct. Many subjoined forms are created by dropping their headline, with many extending the end of the stroke of the main letter body to form an extended tail reaching up to the right of the preceding consonant. This subjoining of trailing letters to create conjuncts is in contrast to the leading half forms of Devanagari and Bengali letters. Ligature conjuncts are not a feature in Telugu, with the only non-standard construction being an alternate subjoined form of Ṣa (borrowed from Kannada) in the KṢa conjunct.

Kannada Kha
Kannada kha (ಖ) is the second letter of its script, and like its closely related Telugu counterpart ఖ, is derived from the Bhattiprolu letter kha. Like its Telugu counterpart, it is generally unchanged by matras, and its subjoined form is the same as its full form:
ಖ್ಖ

Malayalam Kha

Kha (ഖ) is the second letter of the Malayalam abugida. It ultimately arose from the Brahmi letter , via the Grantha letter  kha. Like in other Indic scripts, Malayalam consonants have the inherent vowel "a", and take one of several modifying vowel signs to represent syllables with another vowel or no vowel at all.

Conjuncts of ഖ
As is common in Indic scripts, Malayalam joins letters together to form conjunct consonant clusters. There are several ways in which conjuncts are formed in Malayalam texts: using a post-base form of a trailing consonant placed under the initial consonant of a conjunct, a combined ligature of two or more consonants joined together, a conjoining form that appears as a combining mark on the rest of the conjunct, the use of an explicit candrakkala mark to suppress the inherent "a" vowel, or a special consonant form called a "chillu" letter, representing a bare consonant without the inherent "a" vowel. Kha does not exhibit ligation in conjuncts with other letters, does not have a chillu (bare consonant) form, and uses the explicit virama unless coupled with the normal post-base and repha consonant forms. Texts written with the modern reformed Malayalam orthography, put̪iya lipi, may favor more regular conjunct forms than older texts in paḻaya lipi, due to changes undertaken in the 1970s by the Government of Kerala.
 ഖ് (kʰ) + ര (ra) gives the ligature kʰra:

Sinhala Kha
The Sinhala Suddha ka (ඛ), called mahaapraana kayanna in Unicode, is the second letter of Sinhala script, and is part of the Miśra set of Sinhala consonants. Although it is derived from the Grantha letter kha, modern Sinhala no longer distinguishes between aspirated (Miśra) and unaspirated (Śuddha) consonants, and ඛ is pronounced the same as ක, ka, but is used for loanwords and in higher register writing. ඛ does not have any unique ligatures or conjunct forms, and displays an explicit virama as the first member of a conjunct cluster.

Thai High Kho
Kho khai (ข) and kho khuat (ฃ) are the second and third letters of the Thai script. They fall under the high class of Thai consonants. In IPA, kho khai and kho khuat are pronounced as [kʰ] at the beginning of a syllable and are pronounced as [k̚] at the end of a syllable. Both kho khwai and kho khuat are derived from the old Khmer kha. The next three letters of the alphabet, kho khwai (ค), kho khon (ฅ), and kho ra-khang (ฆ), are also named kho, however, they all fall under the low class of Thai consonants. Unlike many Indic scripts, Thai consonants do not form conjunct ligatures, and use the pinthu—an explicit virama with a dot shape—to indicate bare consonants.

Kho Khai 
In the acrophony of the Thai script, khai (ไข่) means ‘egg’. Kho khai corresponds to the Sanskrit character ‘ख’.

Kho Khuat 
In the acrophony of the Thai script, khuat (ขวด) means ‘bottle’. Kho khuat (ฃ) represents the voiceless velar fricative sound /x/ that existed in Old Thai at the time the alphabet was created but no longer exists in Modern Thai. When the Thai script was developed, the voiceless velar fricative sound did not have a Sanskrit or Pali counterpart so the character kho khai was slightly modified to create kho khuat. During the Old Thai period, this sound merged into the aspirated stop /kʰ/, and as a result the use of this letters became unstable. Although kho khuat is now obsolete, it remains in dictionaries, preserving the traditional count of 44 letters in the Thai alphabet. When the first Thai typewriter was developed by Edwin Hunter McFarland in 1892, there was simply no space for all characters, thus kho khuat was of the two letters left out along with kho khon. Although kho khuat does not appear in modern Thai orthography, some writers and publishers are trying to reintroduce its usage.

Lao Kha
Kho sung or kʰāi (ຂ) is the second letter of the Lao script. It is derived from the old Khmer kha, and is essentially a fossil of Thai kho khai as it existed in the 14th century. Like its Thai counterpart, it is a high tone letter and does not form ligatures or conjuncts.

Tibetan Kha
Kha (ཁ) is the second letter of the Tibetan script, and is derived from the equivalent Siddhaṃ letter. As with all Tibetan letters, it can appear as a head consonant or subjoined to a head consonant. Like many Indic scripts, the halant - an explicit virama - can be used for indicating a bare consonant, although subjoined forms are used to form consonant conjuncts. The subjoined form of kha is essentially identical to its head form:
ཁྑ

Burmese Kha
Kha is the second letter of the Burmese (Myanmar) script, and is probably derived from the Grantha letter kha. Like many Burmese letters, it is not seen with the visible virama, as /kh/ does not occur syllable finally. It can form conjuncts with other velar letters in abbreviations and foreign terms:

Tai Tham High Kha

High Kha is a consonant of the Tai Tham abugida. It ultimately arose from the Brahmi letter , via the Pallava letter  Kha.  The Tai Tham script was originally used to write Pali (the name 'Tham' is a local form of dharma), and faced the same limitations in writing Tai languages as Khmer had.  The Thai solutions were adopted, with consonants being systematically modified by the addition of a tail to supply new consonants, mostly for fricatives.  High Kha was modified, yielding what for convenience we call High Khha (ᨢ).  The two sounds, /kʰ/ and /x/, subsequently merged, and High Khha is now obsolete.

High Kha
Like in other Indic scripts, Tai Tham consonants have the inherent vowel "a", and take one of several modifying vowel signs to represent syllables with another vowel.

Kha can serve as the initial consonant of a stack, and several examples can be seen above.  It can also occur as the final element of a consonant stack in words of Indic origin, both in the cluster kkh of the word Pali word  mokkha 'release' and as the final consonant after apocation of the final vowel, e.g.  lekh 'number'.

High Khha
Like in other Indic scripts, Tai Tham consonants have the inherent vowel "a", and take one of several modifying vowel signs to represent syllables with another vowel.

This form occurs only as the initial consonant of a consonant stack.

Khmer Kha

Kha (ខ) is a consonant of the Khmer abugida. It ultimately arose from the Brahmi letter , via the Pallava letter  Kha.  Like in other Indic scripts, Khmer consonants have the inherent vowel "a", and take one of several modifying vowel signs to represent syllables with another vowel.  Actually, the sounds of the vowels are modified by the consonant; see the article on the Khmer writing system for details.

Comparison of Kha
The various Indic scripts are generally related to each other through adaptation and borrowing, and as such the glyphs for cognate letters, including Kha, are related as well.

Character encodings of Kha
Most Indic scripts are encoded in the Unicode Standard, and as such the letter Kha in those scripts can be represented in plain text with unique codepoint. Kha from several modern-use scripts can also be found in legacy encodings, such as ISCII.

References

 
 Kurt Elfering: Die Mathematik des Aryabhata I. Text, Übersetzung aus dem Sanskrit und Kommentar. Wilhelm Fink Verlag, München, 1975, 
 Georges Ifrah: The Universal History of Numbers. From Prehistory to the Invention of the Computer. John Wiley & Sons, New York, 2000, .
 B. L. van der Waerden: Erwachende Wissenschaft. Ägyptische, babylonische und griechische Mathematik. Birkhäuser-Verlag, Basel Stuttgart, 1966, 
 
 
 Conjuncts are identified by IAST transliteration, except aspirated consonants are indicated with a superscript "h" to distinguish from an unaspirated cononant + Ha, and the use of the IPA "ŋ" and "ʃ" instead of the less dinstinctive "ṅ" and "ś".

Bengali language
Indic letters